A void deck is an open space found on the ground floor of HDB blocks in Singapore. It is used for community activities.

History
At first, HDB blocks did not have void decks in the 1960s. The Housing and Development Board changed the design of the blocks and made the first level free of flats for activities such as light industrial workshops. However, the term "void deck" was not mentioned in HDB's annual reports until 1977–1978. Precinct pavilions are added to newer void decks.

Decoration and artworks
Artists must apply for permission from relevant authorities before displaying their works at void decks as the space belongs to the Town Council of the area where the void deck is located.

Newer void decks
Some void decks are now not located on the ground floor and are integrated with sky gardens. Newer void decks are also smaller in size.

See also
Undercroft

References

External links
Housing and Development Board

Public housing in Singapore
Singaporean culture
1970s neologisms